Luther: The Fallen Sun, stylised onscreen simply as Luther, is a 2023 crime thriller film directed by Jamie Payne and written by Neil Cross. It serves as a film continuation of the 2010–19 British television series of the same name. The film stars Idris Elba (who also serves as a producer on the film), reprising his role as John Luther, with Cynthia Erivo and Andy Serkis.

Luther: The Fallen Sun was released in select cinemas on 24 February 2023, before its streaming release on 10 March 2023, by Netflix.

Plot 
Wealthy city trader and serial killer David Robey blackmails and kidnaps young cleaner Callum Aldrich. DCI John Luther is assigned to the case and promises Callum's mother, Corrine, he will find her son. Concerned about his involvement, Robey digs up dirt on the various illegal acts Luther has committed as a police officer, resulting in him being fired, prosecuted and imprisoned.

Years later, Robey coaxes Corrine and the parents of other victims to a house where he burns their children's corpses. She visits Luther in prison, admonishing him for not finding her son's killer. Robey sends a recording of him murdering Callum to Luther in prison via an FM radio frequency. Luther informs DCI Odette Raine, the new head of Serious and Serial Crime, of the broadcast. He liaises with prison guards and former associate McCabe to break him out of prison. Raine brings in retired DSU Martin Schenk as a consultant. Luther traces Robey to Piccadilly Circus, where Raine deploys armed police SCO19. The two confront him there, but some people he has blackmailed cause a distraction by killing themselves jumping from buildings and crashing cars. Robey escapes into the London Underground after fighting Luther and murdering an armed policeman. 

Robey kidnaps Raine's daughter, Anya. Raine meets with Luther and reluctantly agrees to work with him. They visit Robey's ex-wife Georgette, discovering he owns property abroad. DS Archie Woodward, Raine's subordinate, is blackmailed by Robey into killing Georgette but is intercepted by Schenk (who was sent by Luther to protect Georgette). Archie commits suicide. Luther and Raine travel to Robey's mansion in rural Norway, where they discover he tortures kidnapped victims on livestream called "The Red Bunker" for his followers. The two are overpowered, and Robey tries to force them to hurt each other to save Anya. Luther reveals Georgette told the police the location and they are en route. After a brutal fight, the three are able to escape the bunker, and Luther chases Robey into a frozen lake, where Robey drowns. Luther is rescued by police divers and Schenk. Recovering from his injuries back in London he is approached by Cranfield, a senior official with MI5, who it's implied offers him a job in lieu of going back to prison.

Cast 

 Idris Elba as John Luther, a brilliant but disgraced former Detective Chief Inspector who goes on the run after escaping prison.
 Cynthia Erivo as DCI Odette Raine, the current head of the Serious and Serial Crime Unit, hunting down Luther and Robey.
 Dermot Crowley as Martin Schenk, a retired Detective Superintendent, the former head of the Serious and Serial Crime Unit and Luther's former boss.
 Andy Serkis as David Robey, a wealthy and psychopathic millionaire moonlighting as a serial killer, who uses surveillance technology to manipulate and kill civilians. He is also an adversary of Luther.
 Thomas Coombes as DS Archie Woodward, Raine's subordinate in Serious and Serial Crime. 
 Hattie Morahan as Corinne Aldrich, the mother of a Callum Aldrich, a victim of Robey. 
 Lauryn Ajufo as Anya Raine, DCI Odette Raine's teenage daughter. 
 Vincent Regan as Dennis McCabe, a criminal associate of Luther. 
 Einar Kuusk as Arkady Kachimov, David Robey's right-hand man. 
 Guy Williams as Tim Cranfield, a senior civil servant working for MI5. 
 Henry Hereford as Brian Lee, one of Robey's blackmail victims.
 Tara Fitzgerald (uncredited) as Georgette Robey, Robey's ex-wife and victim.
 Samuel Winner (uncredited) as American Teenager, one of Robey's viewers.

Production
The concept of a film adaptation for the BBC series was broached in August 2013, when series creator Neil Cross revealed he had written a script for a prequel to the series.

In July 2020, Idris Elba stated that there was no "formal plans" for another season of the show, but expressed his desire to return to the role in a film, and that this was close to happening. The film was confirmed in September 2021 for release on Netflix, with Cynthia Erivo and Andy Serkis starring alongside Elba.

Elba announced on 10 November 2021 that filming had begun. Filming took place in London and at Lite Studios in Brussels, Belgium.

Release
Luther: The Fallen Sun was released in select cinemas on 24 February 2023, before its streaming release on 10 March 2023, by Netflix.

Critical response

References

External links
 

2023 thriller films
2020s American films
2020s British films
2020s crime thriller films
2020s English-language films
American crime thriller films
BBC Film films
British crime thriller films
American serial killer films
British serial killer films
Films set in the 2010s
Films set in 2019
Films set in the 2020s
Films set in 2023
Chernin Entertainment films
English-language Netflix original films
Films based on television series
Films produced by Peter Chernin
Films scored by Lorne Balfe
Films shot in Brussels
Films shot in London
Luther (TV series)
Works by Neil Cross